Flatcat may refer to

Flat cat, a fictional Martian species
Flatcat (band)
Flat-headed cat, a small wild cat of the Thai-Malay Peninsula, Borneo and Sumatra